The Reformed Church is a church in Recea, Sălaj, Romania, completed in the 15th century.

The church belfry is listed as a historic monument.

References

External links
 Recea, Reformed church

Reformed churches in Romania
Historic monuments in Sălaj County
Churches in Sălaj County
15th-century churches in Romania